Dr. Robert Bundtzen, M.D. (born 1949) is an American physician and dog musher based in Anchorage, Alaska.

Early life 
Bundzten was born in North Dakota in 1949. As a child, he lived in New Mexico before his family relocated to Alaska in 1960. The family first lived in Fairbanks, Alaska but later moved to Anderson. There, the family of six lived in a mobile home while his father, an electrical engineer, worked to help to create the Ballistic Missile Early Warning System in Clear. The town of Anderson was incredibly small; Bundtzen's school had only one room and the class had only twelve pupils, three of whom were his siblings. His mother was diagnosed with breast cancer during this time and after her passing, the family moved back to Fairbanks. Bundtzen had originally planned on attending the University of Colorado but ultimately decided to enroll at the University of Alaska to stay close to his family. He later attended the University of Washington School of Medicine, earning his Doctor of Medicine in 1975, and subsequently completed his fellowship and residency, focusing on infectious diseases, at the University of Wisconsin in 1978.

Career as a dog musher 
Though Bundzten first experimented with mushing in the '60s as a teenager growing up in Alaska, he did not take the sport seriously until the '90s. His competed in the Iditarod Trail Sled Dog Race for the first time in 1995, taking 13 days, 9 hours, 55 minutes, and 9 seconds to complete the course and coming in 40th place. To date, his best time is 10 days, 15 hours, 25 minutes, and 15 seconds, a time he achieved in 2006, and his highest position was achieved in 1997, when he placed 27th. According to the Iditarod's official website, he has won a combined total of $14,607.88 in prize money and he is sponsored by St. Elias Specialty Hospital, Ted Kouris of Teddy's Tasty Meats, cardiologist Dr. Mark Selland and his wife Kathy Faryniarz, and neurosurgeon Dr. Louis Kralick.

Race history

Personal life 
Bundtzen is married to Dr. Joan Bundzten, M.D. (b. c. 1948), a chemical pathologist. They have a son, Travis Bundtzen (Meghan), an IT technician, and two grandsons. Both he and his wife practice medicine in Anchorage. He has three siblings: Tom, a geologist, Cheryl, an accountant, and Susan (d. 2000), a nurse.

References

External links

  Cabela 2007
 "Complete Musher Summary - Bundtzen, Robert" Iditarod Race Archives

1949 births
Dog mushers from Alaska
Sportspeople from Anchorage, Alaska
People from North Dakota
Living people